Korg: 70,000 B.C. is a 30-minute Saturday morning live-action television series created by Fred Freiberger and produced by Hanna-Barbera Productions; it was broadcast on ABC from September 7, 1974, to August 30, 1975.

Plot
Korg featured the adventures of a family of Neanderthals during the Ice Age. It was intended to be educational, and was based on the best then-current research about Neanderthal life; however, some situations had to be watered down for a young audience. Actor Burgess Meredith supplied the narration.

Cast
 Burgess Meredith as the narrator
 Jim Malinda as Korg
 Bill Ewing as Bok
 Naomi Pollack as Mara
 Christopher Man as Tane
 Charles Morteo as Tor
 Janelle Pransky as Ree

Production
The American Museum of Natural History and The Los Angeles County Museum of Natural History served as consultants to the series.

The series was one of three "serious" programs ABC put on its Saturday morning slate in 1974, along with the animated family dramas Devlin and These Are The Days. All three shows were failures in the ratings, and all were cancelled by January 1975 (although Korg continued in re-runs through August).

Episodes

Home media
The "complete series" (actually only 16 of the 19 episodes) was released by Warner Archive on December 11, 2012.

Merchandise
A board game of the same title was produced by the US toy company Milton Bradley as a direct tie-in. Charlton Comics published a Korg comic book from May 1975 to November 1976 (well after the show had left the air). The series was written and drawn by Pat Boyette, and lasted nine issues.

References

External links

Korg: 70,000 B.C. at the Grand Comics Database
Korg: 70,000 B.C at The Encyclopedia of Science Fiction

1970s American children's television series
1974 American television series debuts
1975 American television series endings
American Broadcasting Company original programming
American children's adventure television series
American children's education television series
Charlton Comics titles
Television series by Hanna-Barbera
Prehistoric people in popular culture
Fiction about neanderthals
Television series set in prehistory
English-language television shows